Eugène-Henri Gravelotte (6 February 1876 – 23 August 1939) was a French fencer. He was the first modern Olympic champion in foil and first French gold medalist, winning the event at the 1896 Summer Olympics in Athens. He was born in Paris.

Gravelotte was undefeated in his group for the preliminary round, defeating Greek fencers Athanasios Vouros, Konstantinos Komninos-Miliotis, and Georgios Balakakis in succession.  He then faced fellow Frenchman Henri Callot, who had gone undefeated in the other group, in the final.  Gravelotte won that match 3–2.

Gravelotte died in Bénodet on 23 August 1939, aged 63.

References

External links

1876 births
1939 deaths
Fencers from Paris
Fencers at the 1896 Summer Olympics
19th-century sportsmen
French male foil fencers
Olympic gold medalists for France
Olympic fencers of France
Olympic medalists in fencing
Medalists at the 1896 Summer Olympics
Recipients of the Croix de Guerre 1914–1918 (France)
Recipients of the Legion of Honour
French military personnel of World War I